Canon EOS M is the first mirrorless interchangeable-lens camera produced by Canon.

DPReview noted that the EOS M is effectively a miniature version of the Canon EOS 650D, which was introduced in June 2012, with a simpler physical interface. The letter M in EOS M stands for "mobility" and EOS means "electro-optical system".

It was superseded by the Canon EOS M2 in late 2013; the Canon EOS M3 in February 2015; the Canon EOS M10 in October 2015; the Canon EOS M6 in August 2017; and the Canon EOS M50 in March 2018.

Design 
The camera has a 3-inch touchscreen with support for multi-touch gestures such as pinch to zoom, swiping and tapping. The camera uses an 18 megapixel APS-C sensor and a DIGIC 5 processor, similar to the Canon EOS 650D.

The camera uses an EF-M lens mount which can accept Canon EF and EF-S lenses with an additional mount adapter. Several EF-M lenses, including a 11–22mm f/4–5.6 IS STM, a 22mm f/2 STM pancake lens, an 18–55mm f/3.5–5.6 IS STM, and a 55–200mm f/4.5–6.3 IS STM are available.

The camera does not include a built-in flash, but launched with a dedicated Canon Speedlite 90EX, part of a bundle pack for this camera in some markets. The camera is capable of supporting Standard Definition video at 30fps or 25fps, 720p HD video at 60fps or 50fps, and 1080p Full HD video at 30fps, 24fps or 25fps.

Firmware updates
On 27 June 2013, firmware version 2.0.2 was released with Improved focusing speed in One-Shot AF mode, among other fixes and improvements. The firmware update did in fact markedly improve the EOS M's speed over the camera's initial firmware, but its autofocus performance was reportedly still not as fast as many other compact system cameras.

On 28 November 2016, firmware version 2.0.3 was released. As per the official note: Corrects a phenomenon in which when using the camera with the EF-S 18–135 mm 3.5–5.6 IS USM or EF 70–300 mm 4–5.6 IS II USM lens, even if lens aberration correction is set to "Enable", correction will not be applied.

Custom firmware
Magic Lantern is an open source (GPL) firmware add-on for some Canon DSLR cameras, which has enhancements for video and still photography without replacing the stock firmware. The Canon EOS M is compatible with Magic Lantern firmware.

See also
Canon EOS R

References

Canon EF-M-mount cameras
Cameras introduced in 2012